The 1993 Men's World Team Squash Championships were held in Pakistan and took place from November 24 until November 30, 1993.

Results

Pool A

Pool B

Semi-finals

Third Place Play Off

Final

See also 
World Team Squash Championships
World Squash Federation
World Open (squash)

References 

World Squash Championships
Squash tournaments in Pakistan
International sports competitions hosted by Pakistan
Squash
Men